Events from the year 1682 in England.

Incumbents
 Monarch – Charles II

Events
 11 March – work begins on construction of the Royal Hospital Chelsea for old soldiers in London.
 22 March – a fire breaks out in Newmarket, Suffolk, consuming half the town and spreading into sections of surrounding Cambridgeshire.  Historian Laurence Echard describes it later as "A Providential Fire", noting that King Charles II "by the approach of the fury of the flames was immediately driven out of his own palace", and, after moving to safety in another section of town, was forced to flee again "when the wind, as conducted by an invisible power, suddenly changed about, and blew the smoke and cinders directly on his new lodgings, and in a moment made them as untenable as the other."
 6 May – while on passage from Portsmouth to Scotland,  runs aground on a sandbank off the Norfolk coast and sinks. The Duke of York (the future King James II) and John Churchill (the future 1st Duke of Marlborough) are among those saved but at least 120 drown.
 25 August – following the Bideford witch trial, three women become (probably) the penultimate known to be hanged for witchcraft in England, at Exeter.
 September – Halley's Comet makes an appearance, and is observed by Edmond Halley himself.
 20 September – The Duke of Monmouth is arrested in Stafford for riotous behaviour.
 19 November – fire at Wapping makes 1,500 homeless.
 20 November – Anthony Ashley-Cooper, 1st Earl of Shaftesbury, flees to Holland after being accused of planning a coup against King Charles II.
 Celia Fiennes, noblewoman and traveller, begins her journeys across Britain in a venture that will prove to be her life's work. Her aim is to chronicle the towns, cities and great houses of the country. Her travels continue until at least 1712, and will take her to every county in England, though the main body of her journal is not written until 1702.

Births
 16 April – John Hadley, inventor (died 1744)
 10 July – Roger Cotes, mathematician (died 1716)
 21 December (approx.) – 'Calico Jack' Rackham, pirate (hanged 1720)

Deaths
 12 February – Thomas Thynne, landowner and politician (born 1647/1648)
 19 October – Sir Thomas Browne author, physician and philosopher (born 1605)
 19 November – Prince Rupert of the Rhine, Royalist commander in the English Civil War (born 1619)

References

 
Years of the 17th century in England